Double Door, a concert hall and nightclub, was located in the Wicker Park neighborhood of Chicago, Illinois, United States. The venue was first opened on June 12, 1994, and was co-owned by Andrew Barrett, Sean Mulroney and Joe Shanahan.  On June 12, 1994, under its current ownership, the Double Door hosted its first show, Lloyd Cole; the same week, the Smashing Pumpkins played under the name the Starchildren. The venue at 1572 N. Milwaukee Avenue had a capacity of 473 people. It was two levels with a stage, sound system, dance floor and bar on the main floor; the second was a mezzanine level, the most intimate area of the club with its lounge type setting.  A second bar and dance floor, Door No. 3, was located downstairs in the basement.

Notable artists who have played Double Door include local acts such as The Smashing Pumpkins, Material Issue, American Cosmonaut, Local H, Veruca Salt, Wilco, Liz Phair, Liquid Soul, Rise Against, Cheap Trick, Andrew Bird and Chance The Rapper, as well as a number of national and international talents, including The Rolling Stones, The Killers, Of Monsters and Men, Cypress Hill, John Legend, Kings of Leon, Kanye West, Sonic Youth, Ray LaMontagne, Har Mar Superstar, and FIDLAR. Double Door also hosted such events as MOB fest, numerous television show and movie filmings, and events sponsored by ASCAP, Maverick Records, MTV, VH1, Nike, Billboard, VICE, Starbucks and Rolling Stone magazine among many others. Scenes of the 2000 feature film High Fidelity were shot at Double Door.

In 2005, the club was nearly shut down due to disagreements about its lease. The landlord, Brian Strauss, doubled the venue's rent.

In 2013, Double Door's basement bar, formerly The Dirtroom, reopened as Door No. 3, with a renewed focus on up-and-coming DJs as well as special events, ranging from electro-swing and cabaret to roots reggae.

After 22 years in Wicker Park, the Double Door began looking to relocate in the Logan Square neighborhood. In 2016, following further leasing disputes, the owners of the Double Door filed a proposal with the city of Chicago to allow them to begin restoring the historic Logan Square State and Savings Bank building located at 2551 N. Milwaukee Ave., about a mile from its original location. 

The Double Door closed due to eviction in 2017. However, by the end of 2018, more information surfaced that Double Door would be relocating instead to the Uptown neighborhood in a bank building that was formerly a theater. In June 2021, owner Sean Mulroney confirmed the purchase of the Wilson Avenue Theater with the intent to re-open the Double Door by the end of the year.

Footnotes

External links
Official website

Music venues in Chicago
Nightclubs in Chicago